Calling Wild Bill Elliott is a 1943 American Western film directed by Spencer Gordon Bennet and written by Anthony Coldeway. The film stars Wild Bill Elliott, George "Gabby" Hayes, Anne Jeffreys, Herbert Heyes, Robert 'Buzz' Henry and Fred Kohler Jr. The film was released on April 30, 1943, by Republic Pictures.

Plot

Cast  
Wild Bill Elliott as Wild Bill Elliott
George "Gabby" Hayes as Gabby Hayes
Anne Jeffreys as Edith Richards
Herbert Heyes as Governor Steve Nichols
Robert 'Buzz' Henry as John Culver Jr. 
Fred Kohler Jr. as John Culver 
Roy Barcroft as Captain Carson
Eve March as Mary Culver
Burr Caruth as Grandpa Culver
Bud Geary as Henchman Dean
Lynton Brent as Ranch hand

References

External links
 

1943 films
1940s English-language films
American Western (genre) films
1943 Western (genre) films
Republic Pictures films
Films directed by Spencer Gordon Bennet
American black-and-white films
1940s American films